Olav Duun (21 November 1876 – 13 September 1939) was a writer of Norwegian fiction. He is generally recognized to be one of the more outstanding writers in Norwegian literature. He once lacked only one vote to receive the Nobel Prize in Literature, and was nominated twenty-four times, in fourteen years.

Early life
Duun was born in the traditional district Ytre Namdal, on Jøa an island in the Namsen Fjord in Fosnes municipality, Nord-Trøndelag county, Norway. His parents were Johannes Antonius Duun and Ellen (Fossum) Duun. Olav Duun was born Ole Johannesen Raaby.  Duun was the oldest in a family of eight siblings. During his years as a boy his family lived at several farms on the island, the last one being Duun. He adopted the last name Duun when he left the island to start his training as a teacher.

He attended the state school at Trøndelag.  In 1901, Duun took a position as a school teacher at Levanger in Nord-Trøndelag county, Norway.

After accepting a post as a teacher
He completed the graduate teacher examination in 1904. In 1908, he was hired by the Ramberg school at Botne in Vestfold, where he combined teaching profession with writing poetry. He worked as a teacher in Holmestrand until 1927. At the  age of fifty,  he retired in order to devote his time to writing.

Writing career
Duun was known as one of the outstanding writers of 20th-century Norwegian fiction. He stands as a remarkable synthesis of the Norwegian folk spirit and the European cultural form. Duun wrote in Landsmål, an amalgam of peasant dialects that developed into Nynorsk, one of the official languages of Norway. In the period 1907-38 he published 25 novels, four short story collections ("sagas" was his own genre term) and two children's books.  Many of his books incorporate the dialects of his subjects: peasants, fishermen and farmers. His novels analyze the psychological and spiritual characteristics of rural, peasant life. Contact with family traditions is a strength for the heroes in his historical novels, and awareness of those who have lived before, and the strength of their actions can help modern people through crises.

The most notable works are his six volume, The People of Juvik, which deals with four generations of a family of peasant landowners. This work was translated into English and published as: The Trough of the Waves (1930), The Blind Man (1931), The Big Wedding (1932),  Odin in Fairyland (1932), Odin Grows Up (1934) and Storm (1935).

Legacy

Former residence, now a library related to his works
Olav and Emma Duun's House (Olav og Emma Duuns Hus) is the former residence of Olav Duun and his wife Emma, at Ramberg in Holmestrand. There is a library containing manuscripts, letters, and other things related to the writing career of Olav Duun. The first floor is at the disposal of recipients of the Duun Scholarship. In the garden, a memorial park has been constructed containing commemorative rocks with  lyrical quotes from Olav Duun’s poems. The address is 20 Olav Duun Street.

Bibliography 

1907: Oddballs and Other People (Løglege skruvar og anna folk)
1908: Marjane
1909: Crosswise (På tvert)
1910: The Slope by Nøkk Lake (Nøkksjøliga)
1911: Old Soil (Gamal jord)
1912: Hilder Island (Hilderøya), Storbåten
1913: Sigyn, Sommareventyr
1914: Three Friends (Tre venner)
1915: Harald
1916: Good Conscience (Det gode samvite)
1917: At Heather Island (På Lyngsøya)
1918-23: The People of Juvik (Juvikfolket)
1918: The Trough of the Waves (Juvikingar)
1919: The Blind Man (I Blinda)
1920: The Big Wedding (Storbybryllope)
1921: Odin in Fairyland (I eventyret)
1922: Odin Grows Up (I ungdommen)
1923: The Storm (I stormen)
1924: Blind-Anders
1925: Straumen og evja
1927: Olsøygutane
1928: Carolus Magnus
1929: Fellow Man (Medmenneske)
1930: On the Road and Getting Lost (Vegar og villstig)
1931: Ragnhild
1932: A Reputation Left Behind (Ettermæle)
1933: The Final Year of Life (Siste leveåre)
1935: God Smiles (Gud smiler)
1936: The Present Age (Samtid)
1938: Floodtide of Fate (Menneske og maktene)

Awards
 1934 - Gyldendal's Endowment (initial award of this prize)
 1935 - Henrik Steffens Prize (initial award of this  prize)

References

Other Reading
Contemporary Authors ( by Gale Reference Team. Thomson Gale. 2007)

External links 
 Dagbladet - Profile of   Olav Duun
Pictures of Olav and Emma Duun's House

1876 births
1939 deaths
People from Fosnes
Nynorsk-language writers
20th-century Norwegian novelists
People from Vestfold
People from Namsos